Stecia Mayanja  alias Faridah is a Ugandan  actress, musician and artist attached to the Golden band. Stecia Mayanja sings in Luganda and English. She was in Eagles Production Band before it became Golden Band, later on she parted ways with the Golden Band.

Career 
Stecia Mayanja is an actress who featured in The Honourables (2017) and  also performs in Stecia and the House Girl.

Personal life 
Stecia Mayanja was legally married to Abbas Mubiru who is working in Dubai. However, she was later in  intimate relationship with her new manager at Golden band called Bashir Bogere. Unfortunately, she got issues with the band directors who showed less interest to her works for some good time.

Discography

Album 

 Kantinti (1930, EP)
 Mulamuzi (2015)
 Wafuka Mulamuzi (2015)
 Figure (2016)
 Alintwala (2022)

Singles 
1. Kantinti

2. Equalizer

3. Kawompo

4. Ssilinda bide

5. Mwami wange

6. Sisuubila

7. Kabalagala

8. Ekilango

9. Mutima

10. Tuli Mumpaka

11. Kantinti Uganda music Dj Din

12. Tulimumpaka

13. Sirinda Bide New Ugandan music 2011 Dj Din

14. Tulimumpaka New

15. Sirinda Bide

16. TULATUTESE

17. Sisubira 18. Wafuuka Mulamuzi

19. Ekirango

Awards

Nominated 

 2016 Uganda Entertainment Awards - Best Female Artist.
 2016 5th Prestigious HiPipo Music Awards - Best Female Artist.
 2017 Prestigious HiPipo Music Awards - Best Female Artist.

See also 

 Music of Uganda
 List of Ugandan musicians

References 

Living people
Ugandan women artists
Ugandan women musicians
Year of birth missing (living people)